The two ships of the U.S.T. Atlantic class, the U.S.T. Atlantic and U.S.T. Pacific, were the largest ships ever built in the American Hemisphere.

Newport News Shipbuilding were the builders, the only American shipbuilders with the facilities for ULCC construction.  A third vessel of the class ordered by Zapata Ocean Carriers was canceled.

Stood on end, each vessel would have been nearly as tall as the Empire State Building.

History
The tankers were built in 1979 at Newport News Shipbuilding's shipyard in Newport News, Virginia. Each vessel cost approximately 136.4 million USD.

In June 2004, the Marine Atlantic—ex U.S.T. Atlantic—was sold to Indian breakers. After clearing Indian customs, she was intentionally beached in India for ship breaking.

In 2007, the Marine Pacific I—ex U.S.T. Pacific—was extensively rebuilt as an FSO for the Campos Basin and renamed Cidade de Macae.

See also
List of world's longest ships

Notes

External links
 Miramar Ship Index
 
 
 Cidade de Macae, ex U.S.T. Pacific 

Oil tankers
Ships built in Newport News, Virginia